The Heart of Salome is a 1927 American romance film directed by Victor Schertzinger and written by Randall Faye. It is based on the 1925 novel The Heart of Salome by Allen Raymond. The film stars Alma Rubens, Walter Pidgeon, Holmes Herbert, Robert Agnew, Erin La Bissoniere and Walter Dugan. The film was released on May 8, 1927, by Fox Film Corporation.

Cast        
Alma Rubens as Helene
Walter Pidgeon as Monte Carroll
Holmes Herbert as Sir Humphrey
Robert Agnew as Redfern
Erin La Bissoniere as Helen's Maid
Walter Dugan as Chauffeur
Barry Norton as Henri Bezanne
Virginia Madison as Madame Bezanne

References

External links
 

1927 films
American romance films
1920s romance films
Fox Film films
Films directed by Victor Schertzinger
American silent feature films
American black-and-white films
1920s English-language films
1920s American films